American singer-songwriter Taylor Swift has written or co-written every song in her discography, with the exception of several cover versions and two guest features, alongside some songs released by other artists. Swift signed with Sony/ATV Tree publishing house in 2004 to become a professional songwriter. Pursuing a country music career in Nashville, she wrote or co-wrote all 11 tracks on her eponymous debut album, which was released by Big Machine Records in 2006. In 2007, Swift released her first extended play (EP), The Taylor Swift Holiday Collection, which includes four cover versions of Christmas classics and two self-written songs. Beautiful Eyes (2008), Swift's second EP, features alternate versions of songs from her debut album and two new tracks.

On her second studio album, Fearless (2008), Swift wrote eight tracks by herself and co-wrote the remaining five with Liz Rose—who had worked with her on her debut album—among others. She wrote all 14 tracks of her third studio album, Speak Now (2010), by herself; the album explores many mainstream pop and rock styles in addition to the country pop sound of its predecessor. On her next release, Red (2012), Swift experimented with many other pop, rock, electronic, and hip hop styles. She wrote nine Red tracks by herself and co-wrote with others including Swedish producers Max Martin and Shellback. Martin and Shellback collaborated with her again on her next two studio albums, 1989 (2014) and Reputation (2017), on which Swift also worked with producer Jack Antonoff and recalibrated her musical identity from country to pop. Antonoff continued collaborating with Swift on her seventh studio album, Lover (2019), which marks her first release after leaving Big Machine for Republic Records; Lover includes three solely-written tracks.

On her 2020 alternative rock and indie folk studio albums, Folklore and Evermore, in addition to Antonoff, Aaron Dessner of the National became a key producer and co-writer. Swift's partner Joe Alwyn was co-writer and co-producer of select tracks. From April 2021, Swift has released two re-recorded albums—Fearless (Taylor's Version) and Red (Taylor's Version)—to claim ownership of the masters of her Big Machine-released albums. Each of the re-recorded albums includes "from the Vault" unreleased songs Swift had written but excluded from the original releases' track lists. One such song, "All Too Well (10 Minute Version)", is the unabridged version of the previously-released "All Too Well". Swift's tenth original studio album, Midnights (2022), features Antonoff as the main collaborator and Dessner as the co-writer and co-producer for select bonus tracks.

In addition to solo material, Swift has recorded two songs as featured artist without a writing credit: "Highway Don't Care" (Tim McGraw, 2013) and "Birch" (Big Red Machine, 2021). She has written songs for film soundtracks including Valentine's Day (2010), The Hunger Games (2012), Fifty Shades Darker (2017), Cats (2019), and Where the Crawdads Sing (2022). Some tracks written by Swift were released as standalone singles for her other projects, such as the Christmas single "Christmas Tree Farm" (2019) and the track "Only the Young" (2020) for her documentary Miss Americana. Among tracks she wrote for other artists are "Best Days of Your Life" (Kellie Pickler), "This Is What You Came For" (Calvin Harris featuring Rihanna), and "Better Man" (Little Big Town).

Released songs

Unreleased songs

Other songs

Notes

References

Sources 

Swift, Taylor
Swift, Taylor